Laminicoccus is a genus of mealy-bugs belonging to the family Pseudococcidae.  The genus was first described in 1960 by Williams. 

Species of this genus are found in both Australia and New Zealand.

Species 
The Encyclopedia of Life lists six species:

 Laminicoccus asteliae Cox 1987
 Laminicoccus eastopi Cox 1987
 Laminicoccus flandersi Williams 1985
 Laminicoccus pandani (Cockerell 1895) (Mealybug)
 Laminicoccus pandanicola (Takahashi 1939)
 Laminicoccus vitiensis (Green & Laing 1924)

References

Pseudococcidae